Philip Reed (1760November 2, 1829) was a United States Senator representing Maryland from 1806 to 1813.

American Revolution
Born near Chestertown in the Province of Maryland in 1760, Reed completed preparatory studies and served with the Continental Army during the American Revolutionary War, attaining the rank of captain of infantry. He participated in the Battle of Stony Point in 1779, and later attested to having cut off the head of an American deserter so that it could be displayed to the troops as a deterrent. Reed was seriously wounded at the Battle of Camden in 1780. He was a member of the Maryland House of Delegates in 1787, sheriff of Kent County, Maryland from 1791 to 1794, and also member of the executive council of Maryland from 1805 to 1806.

War of 1812
Reed was elected as a Democratic-Republican to the United States Senate in 1806 to fill the vacancy caused by the resignation of Robert Wright.  He was reelected the same year and served from November 25, 1806, to March 3, 1813.  Although he voted, on June 17, 1812, against declaring war on Britain, Reed served as a lieutenant colonel of the Twenty-first Regiment of the Maryland Militia and later as lieutenant colonel commandant.

Ambushing British barges at Worton Creek
Four British barges were entering Worton Creek on July 10, 1814. Lieutenant Colonel Philip Reed while visiting neighbors on Worton Creek observed the four British landing barges manned by at least 24 British soldiers coming in. Fully expecting an attack, he borrowed a musket and gathered twenty-nine neighbors armed with duck guns and muskets. Reed and his civilian militia fighters ambushed the enemy barges as they passed. It was reported that the British had suffered 20 killed or wounded. The British barges retreated thus making Reed and his militia the victors.

Battle of Caulk’s Fields
He led a successful defense in the Battle of Caulk's Field in August 1814. A British force led by Peter Parker landed near Caulk’s field. Estimates of the strength of Parker's force vary.  Elting gives a total of 124, Hickey estimates 250, Sharpe suggests about 150, and the website of Kent County, Maryland gives a total of 140. After the British landed late on the night of August 30.  Sailors from the Royal Navy and men of the Royal Marines were represented in the British column.  The militiamen, of the 21st Regiment of Maryland Militia, were commanded by Lieutenant Colonel Philip Reed, who had fought in the American Revolution.  During the advance inland, guides, who may have been victims of impressment, misled the British column, allowing the Americans, who numbered about 200, to be better prepared for the British assault.  Parker's force encountered American skirmishers who were concealed behind the trees. The American skirmishers opened heavy fire from behind their trees. Then the American skirmishers quickly retreated to the main American line. The retreating skirmishers led the British towards American line, which included multiple cannons. The American militia were divided on the flanks, some of their riflemen placed in the woods, and their cavalry placed in the rear. The battle took place at night, and the light of a full moon exposed the British soldiers during their advance, allowing the Americans to open heavy accurate fire with their cannons, muskets, and rifles thus inflicting several casualties.  The Americans held the high ground, giving the defenders an advantage.  British Lieutenant Henry Crease reported that one portion of the British attacking force was briefly able to gain a foothold in the main American position on the high ground, at one point taking one of the American cannons. The Americans cautiously retreated towards near the woods before halting to make another stand opening fire.  The Americans eventually began to run out of ammunition and retreated to regroup and redistribute ammunition. But Parker was then wounded in the thigh and bled to death.  The British fell back after Parker's death.  American casualties totaled three wounded.  British casualties are reported at 41.

Later life
After the War, Reed was elected to the House of Representatives in the Fifteenth Congress, serving from March 4, 1817, to March 3, 1819.  He was an unsuccessful candidate for reelection in 1818 to the Sixteenth Congress, but successfully contested the election of Jeremiah Cosden to the House in the Seventeenth Congress and served the remainder of the term from March 19, 1822, to March 3, 1823.

In 1828, he served as vice president of the Maryland Society of the Cincinnati.

He died in Huntingtown, Maryland, and is interred in the cemetery of Christ Church near Chestertown.

See also
Titles of Nobility Amendment

References

External links 

1902 Gravestone Dedication
Philip Reed – Delmarva Heritage Series

1760 births
1829 deaths
Continental Army soldiers
Members of the Maryland House of Delegates
United States senators from Maryland
People from Chestertown, Maryland
Democratic-Republican Party United States senators
Democratic-Republican Party members of the United States House of Representatives from Maryland